The Caltex Festival of Sydney Open was a professional golf tournament held in 1978 at The Lakes Golf Club in Sydney, New South Wales, Australia. It was a PGA Tour of Australia event with prize money of A$20,000. The event was part of the 1978 Festival of Sydney.

Greg Norman beat Ian Stanley by three strokes after a final round 64, with Jack Newton a further shot behind. Stanley had started the last round with a three stroke lead, with Norman a further three strokes behind, but scored 73.

Winners

References

Former PGA Tour of Australasia events
Golf tournaments in Australia
Golf in New South Wales
Sport in Sydney